The Wilga gas field in Poland was discovered in 2000. It began production in 2001 and produces natural gas. The total proven reserves of the Wilga gas field are around 37 billion cubic feet (1×109m³).

References

Natural gas fields in Poland